Tisamenus, the son of Antiochus, is mentioned in book 9 of The History by Herodotus. Tisamenus was a soothsayer for the Greek army during the Persian War. A Delphic oracle had foretold that he would win five great battles, and so the Spartans wished to hire him. Although he was from Elea, he and his brother were made citizens of Sparta as part of the deal. They were the only foreign men this privilege had ever been bestowed upon.

References

People of the Greco-Persian Wars
Ancient Eleans
5th-century BC Spartans